Joseph Marie Paul Lucien Roland Beaudry (February 14, 1906 – December 14, 1964) was a Canadian politician, journalist, publicist and publisher.

Biography
Born in Montreal, Quebec, he was elected to the House of Commons of Canada in the 1945 election as a Member of the Liberal Party to represent the riding of St. James. He was re-elected in 1949 in St. James, and 1953 and 1957 in Saint-Jacques.

Involvement in sports
Beaudry was also a sports broadcaster and an amateur ice hockey player, a goaltender, and a member of the 1927 Montreal Victorias ice hockey team that toured Europe and played against teams in Sweden (Stockholm), France, Germany, Austria (Vienna), Switzerland (Davos), Italy (Milan) and England. Also a recreational tennis player there was a story retold in the February 23, 1935 issue of the Montreal Gazette where Beaudry during a banquet in Stockholm had agreed to play tennis against one Mr. Gay ("Mr. G") the next morning, but Beaudry slept in the next morning after a late night out the previous day, apparently unaware of that "Mr. Gay" was in fact the Swedish King Gustaf V.

References

1906 births
1964 deaths
Liberal Party of Canada MPs
Members of the House of Commons of Canada from Quebec
Politicians from Montreal
Montreal Victorias players